The Gwynedd Valley station is a transit station which is located on the SEPTA Lansdale/Doylestown Line. The station, which is situated at the grade crossing of Plymouth Road in Gwynedd Valley (part of Lower Gwynedd Township, Pennsylvania), includes a 166-space parking lot.  

In FY 2013, Gwynedd Valley station had a weekday average of 210 boardings and 237 alightings.

Notes
The train station was featured on the cover of the October 7, 1961 edition of the Saturday Evening Post. The cover was painted by Whitpain Township resident John Falter.

Station layout
Gwynedd Valley has two low-level side platforms.

Gallery

References

External links
SEPTA – Gwynedd Valley Station
December 28, 2001 Bob Vogel Photo(NYC Subways.org)
 Station from Plymouth Road from Google Maps Street View

SEPTA Regional Rail stations
Former Reading Company stations
Railway stations in Montgomery County, Pennsylvania
Stations on the SEPTA Main Line
Railway stations in the United States opened in 1888